Saint-Barthélemy French or St. Barts patois is the dialect of French spoken in the Caribbean, on the French-controlled island of Saint-Barthélemy and by a small emigrant community on Saint Thomas in the US Virgin Islands.

Saint Barts
The dialect co-exists on St. Barts alongside Antillean Creole and Standard French. Despite this linguistic diversity on so small an island, fluency across the varieties of French is generally uncommon. Presently the language is spoken by 500–700 people (mostly old people).

Saint Thomas
A small population of St. Barth’s fishermen settled in St. Thomas (over 200 km away) in the 19th century. The enclave of fewer than 1000 people has maintained its language despite great pressure from the surrounding community. However, in recent years, emigration to the United States has increased the rate of attrition to English.

References

Citations

Bibliography

CALVET, Louis-Jean and Robert CHAUDENSON. Saint-Barthélemy: une  énigme linguistique. Paris,  CIRELFA, Agence de la Francophonie, 1998.
DILLARD, Joey Lee. Perspectives on Black English. 1975.
VALDMAN, Albert. French and Creole in Louisiana. 1997.
WITTMANN, Henri. Grammaire comparée des variétés coloniales du  français  populaire de Paris du 17e siècle et origines du français  québécois. Le français des   Amériques, ed. Robert Fournier   & Henri Wittmann, 281-334. Trois-Rivières: Presses universitaires de Trois-Rivières. 1995. 

French language in France
Saint Barthélemy culture
French language in the Americas